Monomoy Island National Wildlife Refuge is a federal wildlife refuge located on Monomoy Island in Massachusetts.

The island was taken over by the US government just before World War II and established as a National Wildlife Refuge in 1944. The island was also home to the Monomoy Island Gunnery Range from 1944 until 1951. The refuge's goal is to provide habitat for migratory birds. The size of the refuge is 7,604 acres (31 km²) with varied habitats of oceans, salt and freshwater marshes, dunes, freshwater ponds, and some historic manmade structures, such as the Monomoy Point Light and keeper's quarters (decommissioned but open to the public). Part of the refuge is the Monomoy Wilderness.

References

External links
  The National Fish and Wildlife's Monomoy Home Page
  Monomoy Maps, Photos, and News

Chatham, Massachusetts
Massachusetts natural resources
National Wildlife Refuges in Massachusetts
Protected areas established in 1944
Protected areas of Barnstable County, Massachusetts
Wetlands of Massachusetts
Landforms of Barnstable County, Massachusetts
1944 establishments in Massachusetts